Bardhere District is a district in the southwestern Gedo region of Somalia. It was first made a political district in 1941. A decade and a half later, during the 1956 general elections, a Somali parliament was voted to be put into place by 1960, once independence would be achieved. All elected Gedo Representatives were elected from the districts of Bardhere and Luuq.

The district seat is Bardhere.

References

External links
 Administrative map of Bardhere District

Districts of Somalia

Gedo